Jonathan Goerlach (born 7 November 1982) is an elite Australian triathlete with a disability. He  represented Australia at the 2020 Summer Paralympics.

Early life and education
Goerlach was born on 7 November 1982 in Nowra, New South Wales. He has usher syndrome, which means he has moderate hearing loss, is night-blind and has only tunnel vision. He attended Bomaderry High School. He has a Bachelor of Sports Management from the University of Canberra.

Career
Goerlach made his triathlon debut in 2012 and represented Australia at his first ITU World Championships in Auckland later that year. His para triathlon category (PTVI) was not a medal event at 2016 Summer Paralympics.

In 2018, he moved to Wollongong, New South Wales and is coached by 2012 London Olympian Brendan Sexton.

At the 2020 Summer Olympics Goerlach competed in PTVI and finished eighth. His guide at the 2020 Summer Paralympics was David Mainwaring.

At the 2022 Commonwealth Games, Goerlach with guide David Mainwaring won the bronze medal in the Men's PYVI.

In 2021, he is a New South Wales Institute of Sport athlete.

In 2021, he  was awarded the Triathlon Australia's Male Paratriathlon Performance of the Year award after a stellar season of racing culminating in a gold medal at the 2020 Devonport ITU World Paratriathlon Series.

Career Highlights:
2016 Rotterdam ITU Paratriathlon World Championships - 10th
2017 Devonport OTU Triathlon Oceania Championships - 1st
2017 Gold Coast ITU World Paratriathlon Series - 1st
2017 ITU World Triathlon Grand Final Rotterdam - 6th
2018 Edmonton ITU World Paratriathlon Series -1st
2019 Yokohama ITU World Paratriathlon Series - 2nd
2019 Tokyo ITU Paratriathlon World Cup - 3rd
2020 Devonport ITU World Paratriathlon Series - 1st
2021 Tokyo Summer Paralympics - 8th in PTVI
2022 Commonwealth Games - 3rd PTVI

References

External links

World Triathlon Profile

1982 births
Living people
Australian male triathletes
Paratriathletes of Australia
Paratriathletes at the 2020 Summer Paralympics
Visually impaired category Paralympic competitors
People from Nowra
Sportsmen from New South Wales
20th-century Australian people
21st-century Australian people
Commonwealth Games bronze medallists for Australia
Commonwealth Games medallists in triathlon
Triathletes at the 2022 Commonwealth Games
University of Canberra alumni
Medallists at the 2022 Commonwealth Games
Australian blind people